Jarosław Kowalczyk (born 23 April 1989) is a Polish former racing cyclist, who rode professionally between 2010 and 2014 for the Aktio Group Mostostal Puławy and  teams, including competing at the 2014 UCI Road World Championships. After his retirement from cycling, Kowalczyk became director of the Pelplińskie Centrum Sportu in Pelplin, Poland.

Major results

2010
 3rd Road race, National Under-23 Road Championships
2011
 1st Stage 4 Dookoła Mazowsza
 3rd Overall Carpathia Couriers Paths
2012
 1st Stage 3 Dookoła Mazowsza
2013
 6th Overall Dookoła Mazowsza
1st Stage 4 (TTT)
 10th Overall Tour du Maroc
 10th Overall Tour de Serbie
2014
 1st  Overall Tour de Serbie
1st Stage 2
 6th Overall Dookoła Mazowsza
 6th Memoriał Andrzeja Trochanowskiego

References

External links

1989 births
Living people
Polish male cyclists
Place of birth missing (living people)